Group K of the 2017 Africa Cup of Nations qualification tournament was one of the thirteen groups to decide the teams which qualified for the 2017 Africa Cup of Nations finals tournament. The group consisted of four teams: Senegal, Niger, Namibia, and Burundi.

The teams played against each other home-and-away in a round-robin format, between June 2015 and September 2016.

Senegal, the group winners, qualified for the 2017 Africa Cup of Nations.

Standings

Matches

Goalscorers
5 goals

 Fiston Abdul Razak

3 goals

 Sadio Mané

2 goals

 Victorien Adebayor
 Peter Shalulile
 Mame Biram Diouf
 Moussa Konaté

1 goal

 Pierre Kwizera
 Abbas Nshimirimana
 Enock Sabumukama
 Deon Hotto
 Benson Shilongo
 Hendrik Somaeb
 Koffi Dan Kowa
 Moussa Maâzou
 Souleymane Dela Sacko
 Keita Baldé
 Mohamed Diamé
 Famara Diedhiou
 Cheikhou Kouyaté
 Oumar Niasse
 Pape Souaré

Notes

References

External links
Orange Africa Cup Of Nations Qualifiers 2017, CAFonline.com

Group K